Marike Forest Park  is a forest park, and is located in North Bank in the Gambia. Established on January 1, 1954, it covers 174 hectares.

Marike Forest Park has an elevation of 17 metres.

References
  
 

Protected areas established in 1954
Forest parks of the Gambia